Cardiss Hortense Collins (September 24, 1931 – February 3, 2013) was an American politician from Illinois who served in the United States House of Representatives from 1973 to 1997. A member of the Democratic Party, she was the fourth African-American woman in Congress and the first to represent the Midwest. Collins was elected to Congress in the June 5, 1973 special election to replace her husband, George, who had died in the December 8, 1972 United Airlines Flight 553 plane crash a month after being elected to a second term. The seat had been renumbered and combined from the 6th district to the 7th, and had been redrawn to include the Loop. She had previously worked as an accountant in various state government positions.

Congressional career 
Throughout her political career, she was a champion for women's health and welfare issues. In 1975, she was instrumental in prompting the Social Security Administration to revise Medicare regulations to cover the cost of post-mastectomy breast prosthesis, which before then had been considered cosmetic. In 1979, she was elected as president of the Congressional Black Caucus, a position she used to become an occasional critic of President Jimmy Carter. She later became the caucus vice chairman. In the 1980s, Collins warded off two primary challenges from Alderman Danny K. Davis, who would finally be elected to replace her in 1996. In 1990, Collins, along with 15 other African-American women and men, formed the African-American Women for Reproductive Freedom.

In 1991, Collins was named chair of the Energy and Commerce Subcommittee on Commerce, Consumer Protection, and Competitiveness.  Her legislative interests were focused on establishing universal health insurance, providing for gender equity in college sports, and reforming federal child care facilities. Collins gained a brief national prominence in 1993 as the chairwoman of a congressional committee investigating college sports and as a critic of the NCAA. During her last term (1995–1997), she served as ranking member of the Government Reform and Oversight Committee. She also engaged in an intense debate with Rep. Henry Hyde over Medicaid funding of abortion that year.

Retirement, death and honors 
Collins did not seek re-election in 1996, citing her age and the Republican majority in the House. In 2004, she was selected by Nielsen Media Research to head a task force examining the representation of African Americans in TV rating samples. Collins lived in Alexandria, Virginia  at the time of her death on February 3, 2013, at the age of 81. The United States Postal Service's Cardiss Collins Processing and Distribution Center, located at 433 W. Harrison St. in Chicago, Illinois, is named in her honor and was completed in 1996 to replace the old Main Post Office across the street on Van Buren Street.

See also 
 List of African-American United States representatives 
 Women in the United States House of Representatives

References 

 Congressional Biography
 University of Maryland. Women's Studies Database. Government and Politics. Women in Congress biography.
 "Nielsen Appoints Prominent Community and Industry Leaders to Independent Task Force on TV Measurement." Nielsen Media Research. 06/08/04.

External links 
 
 
 Cardiss Collins' oral history video excerpts at The National Visionary Leadership Project
 FBI file on Cardiss Collins at the Internet Archive

|-

|-

1931 births
2013 deaths
20th-century American politicians
20th-century American women politicians
African-American members of the United States House of Representatives
African-American people in Illinois politics
African-American women in politics
Burials at Arlington National Cemetery
Democratic Party members of the United States House of Representatives from Illinois
Female members of the United States House of Representatives
Spouses of Illinois politicians
Women in Illinois politics
20th-century African-American women
20th-century African-American politicians
21st-century African-American people
21st-century African-American women